Rancid may refer to:

 Rancidification, the oxidation of fats, fatty acids, and edible oils
 Rancid (band), an American punk band, and their eponymous releases:
 Rancid (EP), the above group's self-titled debut EP released in 1992
 Rancid (1993 album), their first full-length album 
 Rancid (2000 album), second self-titled album
 Rancid (film), a 2004 Swedish film
 RANCID (software), network management software
 Rancid News, a punk zine also known as Last Hours